Never Not Love You is a 2018 Filipino romantic drama film written and directed by Antoinette Jadaone, starring James Reid and Nadine Lustre.  The film tells the story of Gio (Reid) and Joanne (Lustre) whose young, carefree, and reckless love is tested when their dreams take them in different directions.

The film was produced by Viva Films in collaboration with Project 8 Projects. It was released in theaters nationwide on March 31, 2018.

Cast
 James Reid as Gio Smith
 Nadine Lustre as Joanne Candelaria
 Gab Lagman as Gab
 Luis Alandy as Jason
 Yayo Aguila as Joanne's mother
 Sharmaine Suarez as Ms. Bing
 Alexis Navarro as Joanne's office best friend
 Jamie Scott Gordon as David
 Rez Cortez as Joanne's father
 Vitto Marquez as Joanne's brother
 Josef Elizalde as Joanne's co-worker
 Abby Bautista as Joanne's younger sister

Production

Development
The film's initial title was Five Years Later, then changed to Here's to the Fools. On December 22, 2017, the director announced the final title of the film to be Never Not Love You.

Filming
The film's shooting locations are Makati CBD, Zambales, and London.

Soundtrack
 

The soundtrack of the film includes music and performances by John Roa, Janine Teñoso, Marion Aunor, Ebe Dancel, and James Reid and Nadine Lustre. The first song released with an official music video is "Prom" performed by James Reid and Nadine Lustre. It also serves as the lead single for the soundtrack of the film. John Roa's "Oks Lang" was featured in the 2nd teaser for the film.

Notes
 "Bulong" is a cover of "Bulong" by Kitchie Nadal.
 "Prom" is a cover of "Prom" by Sugarfree.
 "Sana" is a cover of "Sana" by Up Dharma Down.
 Ebe Dancel of the band Sugarfree made an acoustic version of "Prom" for the film.

Release
The film was theatrically released on 2018 March 31.

International screening
The film made an international screening in few selected theaters in United States and Middle East In November 2018, it was screened at the International Film Festival of India held in the city of Goa as part of the World Panorama section.

Reception

Box office
Never Not Love You grossed ₱20 million on its second day of showing in over 200 theaters according to the Instagram post of Viva Artists Agency. As of April 15, 2018, the film gross an estimated amount of ₱92 million.

Critical response
Never Not Love You received mostly positive reviews from critics with particular praise going to the performances of Lustre and Reid and the directorial efforts of Jadaone. In a review for Rappler.com, Oggs Cruz said that "the film is so meticulously threadbare, it feels like its central love story belongs not in the realms of commercial entertainment but in the real world". He called the film Jadaone's "most grounded romance" and praised the director's ability "for turning the nondescript to magic..."

Wanggo Gallaga of the website Click the City gave the film 5 out of 5 stars and described Reid as "charming as hell" and called Lustre a "powerhouse" and the "real star" of the film while praising her performance by saying that "There is a whole world of emotions within her that she carries with every movement".

Inquirer Cake Evangelista called the film as the lead stars' "best work so far". Reid was commended for finding a "balance" in his character and Lustre for being someone who "evokes a wealth of meaning and emotion". Director Jadaone was called the film's "true strength". Evangelista noted that "In Never Not love You, Jadaone shows us a different side of herself as a storyteller."

The Neighborhood Philbert Dy gave the film a rating of 4 out of 5 and praised how it "smartly examines modern romance in oddly pragmatic terms". He praised Reid for leaning into his character and described Lustre as the one who "shines in the movie". Regarding Lustre's performance as Joanne, he said that the actress "just makes everything feel meaningful". He also noted that the pair displays "a familiarity and chemistry that might just be unmatched."

Accolades

References

External links
 
 

2018 films
2018 romantic drama films
Philippine romantic drama films
Viva Films films
Films set in London
Films directed by Antoinette Jadaone